Cancellaria is a genus of medium-sized to large sea snails, marine gastropod mollusks in the family Cancellariidae, the nutmeg snails.

Species 
Species within this genus include:

 Cancellaria adelae  Pilsbry, 1940
 Cancellaria africana Petit, 1970
 Cancellaria agalma Melvill & Standen, 1901
 Cancellaria albida Hinds, 1843
 † Cancellaria bajaensis Perrilliat & Cristín, 2016 
 Cancellaria candida Sowerby I, 1832
 Cancellaria coctilis Reeve, 1856
 Cancellaria coltrorum Harasewych & Petit, 2014
 † Cancellaria conradiana Dall, 1889
 Cancellaria cooperii Gabb, 1865
 Cancellaria corrosa Reeve, 1856
 Cancellaria crawfordiana Dall, 1892
 Cancellaria cremata Hinds, 1843
 Cancellaria crenulata Deshayes, 1835 
 Cancellaria darwini Petit, 1970
 Cancellaria decussata Sowerby I, 1832
 Cancellaria elata Hinds, 1843
 Cancellaria euetrios Barnard, 1959
 Cancellaria fusca Sowerby III, 1889
 Cancellaria gemmulata Sowerby I, 1832
 Cancellaria indentata Sowerby I, 1832
 Cancellaria io Dall, 1896
 Cancellaria jayana Keen, 1958
 Cancellaria littoriniformis Sowerby I, 1832
 Cancellaria lyrata A. Adams & Reeve, 1850
 Cancellaria mediamericana  Petuch, 1998
 Cancellaria nassa Roissy, 1805 
 Cancellaria obesa Sowerby I, 1832
 Cancellaria obtusa Deshayes, 1830
 Cancellaria ovata Sowerby I, 1832
 † Cancellaria paleocenica Perrilliat & Cristín, 2016 
 Cancellaria peruviana Strong, 1954
 Cancellaria petuchi  Harasewych, Petit & Verhecken, 1992
 Cancellaria plebeja Thiele, 1925
 Cancellaria reticulata  (Linnaeus, 1767)
 Cancellaria richardpetiti  Petuch, 1987
 Cancellaria rosewateri  Petit, 1983
 Cancellaria semperiana Crosse, 1863
 Cancellaria souverbiei Crosse, 1868
 Cancellaria thomasiana Crosse, 1861
 Cancellaria turrita Sowerby II, 1874: species inquirenda
 Cancellaria umbilicata Lesson, 1842 (nomen dubium)
 Cancellaria uniangulata Deshayes, 1830
 Cancellaria urceolata Hinds, 1843
 Cancellaria ventricosa Hinds, 1843

Subgenus Cancellaria (Crawfordina) Dall, 1919
 Cancellaria (Crawfordina) stuardoi McLean & Andrade, 1982: synonym of Merica stuardoi (McLean & Andrade, 1982)
Subgenus Cancellaria (Euclia) H. Adams & A. Adams, 1854
 Cancellaria (Euclia) balboae Pilsbry, 1931
 Cancellaria (Euclia) cassidiformis Sowerby, 1832
 Cancellaria (Euclia) laurettae Petit & Harasewych, 1998
Subgenus Cancellaria (Habesolatia) Kuroda, 1965
 Cancellaria (Habesolatia) nodulifera Sowerby, 1825
Subgenus Cancellaria (Hertleinia) Marks, 1949
 Cancellaria (Hertleinia) mitriformis Sowerby, 1832: synonym of Narona mitriformis (G.B. Sowerby I, 1832) in turn synonym of  Hertleinia mitriformis (G.B. Sowerby I, 1832)
Subgenus Cancellaria (Massyla) H. Adams & A. Adams, 1854
 Cancellaria (Massyla) cumingiana Petit de la Saussaye, 1844

Species names brought into synonymy 
 Cancellaria aqualica Petit & Harasewych, 1986: synonym of Merica aqualica (Petit & Harasewych, 1986)
 Cancellaria boucheti Petit & Harasewych, 1986: synonym of Merica boucheti (Petit & Harasewych, 1986)
 Cancellaria cancellata: synonym of Bivetiella cancellata (Linnaeus, 1767)
 Cancellaria citharella Lamarck, 1822: synonym of Cythara striata Schumacher, 1817
 Cancellaria corrugata Hinds, 1843: synonym of Massyla corrugata (Hinds, 1843)
 Cancellaria elegans G. B. Sowerby I, 1822: synonym of Merica elegans (G. B. Sowerby I, 1822)
 Cancellaria ghiorum Costa, 1993: synonym of Cancellaria crawfordiana Dall, 1891
 Cancellaria grayi Tryon, 1885: synonym of Merica asperella (Lamarck, 1822)
 Cancellaria haemastoma Sowerby I, 1832: synonym of Bivetopsia haemastoma (G. B. Sowerby I, 1832)
 Cancellaria lamellosa Hinds, 1843 : synonym of Scalptia nassa (Gmelin, 1791)
 Cancellaria mangelioides Reeve, 1856: synonym of Scalptia scalariformis (Lamarck, 1822)
 Cancellaria nassiformis Lesson, 1842: synonym of Phrontis nassiformis (Lesson, 1842)
 Cancellaria parva Philippi, 1860 (non Lea, 1833): synonym of Sveltella philippii Cossmann, 1899
 Cancellaria patricia Thiele, 1925: synonym of Microsveltia patricia (Thiele, 1925)
 Cancellaria undulata G.B. Sowerby II, 1849 : synonym of Sydaphera undulata (G.B. Sowerby II, 1849)

References

Cancellariidae
Gastropod genera
Taxa named by Jean-Baptiste Lamarck